Ishizu Station is the name of two train stations in Japan:

 Ishizu Station (Gifu)
 Ishizu Station (Osaka)